The Al Muthanna governorate election of 2009 was held on 31 January 2009 alongside elections for all other governorates outside Iraqi Kurdistan and Kirkuk.

Results 

|- style="background-color:#E9E9E9"
! style="text-align:left;vertical-align:top;" |Coalition 2005/2009!! Allied national parties !! Leader !!Seats (2005) !! Seats (2009) !! Change !!Votes
|-
| style="text-align:left;" |State of Law Coalition || style="text-align:left;" | Islamic Dawa Party || style="text-align:left;" |Nouri Al-Maliki|| 4 || 5 ||+1 ||22,627
|-
| style="text-align:left;" |Al Mihrab Martyr List || style="text-align:left;" |ISCI|| style="text-align:left;" |Abdul Aziz al-Hakim|| 8 || 5 || -3 || 19,448
|-
| style="text-align:left;" |Al-Jmour || || || - || 3 || +3 ||14,520
|-
| style="text-align:left;" |National Reform Trend || National Reform Trend || style="text-align:left;" |Ibrahim al-Jaafari|| - || 3 || +3 ||12,878
|-
| style="text-align:left;" |Independent Free Movement List || style="text-align:left;" |Sadrist Movement || style="text-align:left;" |Muqtada al-Sadr || - || 2 || +2 || 11,436
|-
| style="text-align:left;" |Gathering for Muthana || || || 4 || 2 || -2 ||10,867
|-
| style="text-align:left;" |Independent National List||  || || - || 2 || +2 ||9,854
|-
| style="text-align:left;" |Independent Iraqi Skills Gathering || || || - || 2 || +2 ||8,941
|-
| style="text-align:left;" |Middle Euphrates Gathering || || || - || 2 || +2 ||8,322
|-
| style="text-align:left;" |Islamic Virtue Party || style="text-align:left;" |Islamic Vertue Party ||Abdelrahim Al-Husseini || 6 || - || -6 ||7,500
|-
| style="text-align:left;" |Iraqi National List  || style="text-align:left;" |Iraqi National Accord || || 3 || - || -3 ||6,897
|-
| style="text-align:left;" |Iraqi Communist Party || style="text-align:left;" |Iraqi Communist Party || || 2 || - || -2 ||2,517
|-
| style="text-align:left;" |Al-Furat Al-Aswat Assembly || || || 6 || - || -6 ||
|-
| style="text-align:left;" |Islamic Independence Society || || || 5 || - || -5 ||
|-
| style="text-align:left;" |Allegiance Coalition  || || || 3 || - || -3 ||
|-
| style="text-align:left;" |Other Parties  || || ||  ||  || || 71,936
|-
| style="text-align:left;" colspan=2 | Total || || 41 || 26 || -15||207,752
|-
|colspan=5|Sources: this article - al Sumaria - New York Times -  
|}

References 

2009 Iraqi governorate elections